"The Blue Note Sessions" and variants thereof usually refer to material recorded by Blue Note Records. Releases of this material include:

Thelonious Monk Blue Note Sessions (1947-1952), by pianist Thelonious Monk
Introducing Kenny Burrell: The First Blue Note Sessions (2000), by guitarist Kenny Burrell
The Complete Blue Note 45 Sessions (1987), of saxophonist Ike Quebec, #121
The Complete Blue Note Hank Mobley Fifties Sessions (1998), by saxophonist Hank Mobley, #181
The Complete Edmond Hall/James P. Johnson/Sidney De Paris/Vic Dickenson Blue Note Sessions (1985); see Mosaic Records discography, #109
The Complete Art Hodes Blue Note Sessions (1944); see Art Hodes
The Pete Johnson/Earl Hines/Teddy Bunn Blue Note Sessions (1987); see Mosaic Records discography, #119
The Complete Blue Note 1964-66 Jackie McLean Sessions (1994), see Jacknife (album), #150
The Complete February 1957 Jimmy Smith Blue Note Sessions (1994); see Mosaic Records discography, #154
The Complete Blue Note Andrew Hill Sessions (1963-66) (1995); see One for One (Andrew Hill album)
The Complete Blue Note Lee Morgan Fifties Sessions (1995); see Mosaic Records discography, #162
The Complete Blue Note/UA Curtis Fuller Sessions; see Two Bones
The Complete Blue Note Sam Rivers Sessions; 
The Complete Blue Note Blue Mitchell Sessions (1963-67) (1998); see Mosaic Records discography, #178
The Complete Blue Note Donald Byrd/Pepper Adams Studio Sessions (1999); see Mosaic Records discography, #194
The Complete Blue Note Elvin Jones Sessions (1999); see Mosaic Records discography, #195
The Complete Blue Note Horace Parlan Session (2000); see Mosaic Records discography, #197
The Blue Note Stanley Turrentine Quintet/Sextet Studio Sessions (2002); see Mosaic Records discography, #212
The Complete Blue Note Lou Donaldson Sessions 1957-1960 (2002); see Mosaic Records discography, #215

See also
Blue Note Recordings (disambiguation)
Blue Note (disambiguation)